Grigorios or Gregorios ( “watchful; alert; awake”, from ἐγρήγορᾰ  ), and the variant Grigoris (Γρηγόρης), are the Greek forms of the name Gregory. It can refer to:

 Grigoris (catholicos), 4th-century catholicos of Caucasian Albania and martyr
 Grigorios Argyrokastritis (died 1828), Archbishop of Athens
 Grigoris Arnaoutoglou (born 1973), Greek television presenter and radio producer
 Grigorios Athanasiou (born 1984), Greek football player
 Grigoris Balakian (1875–1934), bishop of the Armenian Apostolic Church
 Grigoris Georgatos (born 1972), Greek footballer
 Grigorios Konstantas (1753–1844), Greek scholar
 Grigoris Lambrakis (1912–1963), Greek politician
 Grigoris Makos (born 1987), Greek footballer
 Grigorios Polychronidis (born 1981), Greek boccia player
 Grigorios Spandidakis (1909–1996), Greek general and minister
 Grigorios Vegleris, Greek-Ottoman official and Prince of Samos
 Gregorios Xenopoulos (1867–1951), Greek writer and educationalist
 Grigorios Zalykis (1785–1827), Greek scholar and diplomat

Greek masculine given names